Marušin kámen (also known as Maruša) is a side peak of the mountain Velká Deštná

Mountains and hills of the Czech Republic
Rychnov nad Kněžnou District
Mountain peaks of the Sudetes